Toumoukoro (also spelled Toumoukro) is a town in the far north of Ivory Coast. It is a sub-prefecture of Ouangolodougou Department in Tchologo Region, Savanes District. A border crossing with Mali is located five kilometres north of town.

Toumoukoro was a commune until March 2012, when it became one of 1126 communes nationwide that were abolished.

In 2014, the population of the sub-prefecture of Toumoukoro was 34,200.

Villages
The 13 villages of the sub-prefecture of Toumoukoro and their population in 2014 are:

Notes

Sub-prefectures of Tchologo
Ivory Coast–Mali border crossings
Former communes of Ivory Coast